Arif Alikhan is a former senior official with the U.S. Department of Justice who has served in several high-level law enforcement and homeland security positions with the federal government and City of Los Angeles.   He was also the Deputy Executive Director for homeland security, law enforcement, and fire/EMS at Los Angeles World Airports. He was appointed to the new position in October 2011 and is responsible for the 1,200 sworn police officers and civilian security officers that protect Los Angeles International Airport, Ontario International Airport, and Van Nuys Airport. He is also responsible for all fire and emergency medical services at LAWA's three airports.
Alikhan is a former distinguished professor of homeland security and counterterrorism at the National Defense University (NDU), College of International Security Affairs in Washington, D.C. He teaches and lectures on a variety subjects involving homeland and national security issues for U.S. military and civilian security professionals. and is a recognized expert on U.S. government homeland security and counter terrorism policies.

In 2014, Alikhan was appointed the director of constitutional policing and policy for the Los Angeles Police Department, where he served as the highest-ranking civilian commander in the 150-year history of the LAPD.  Former LAPD chief Charlie Beck appointed Alikhan to the position and elevated his rank to that of an assistant chief of police.

Alikhan was appointed to the Obama Administration in 2009 as Assistant Secretary for Policy Development at the United States Department of Homeland Security. He is also a former deputy mayor of Homeland Security and Public Safety for the City of Los Angeles, former federal prosecutor with the United States Attorneys Office in Los Angeles, and a former senior adviser to Attorneys General John Ashcroft and Alberto Gonzales while serving at the Department of Justice in Washington, D.C.

Alikhan is currently the president and general counsel of TacLogix, Inc., a public safety technology consultancy.  He is also a frequent lecturer on constitutional policing, executive leadership, risk management, and police reform and has made several media appearances providing his insights and expertise. He has also published articles and studies on police training, policy development, and technology in public safety.

Early life 
Arif Alikhan was born in 1968 after his parents immigrated to North America from Pakistan (mother) and India (father) in the late 1960s. He is one of several accomplished South Asian Americans appointed to the Obama Administration. and is a highly regarded public servant in the homeland security, counter terrorism, and law enforcement fields.

He grew up in Diamond Bar, CA where he attended Diamond Bar High School and graduated in the charter class of 1986.

Education 
Alikhan graduated cum laude from the University of California, Irvine in 1990 with a Bachelor of Arts degree in Social Ecology. He studied criminal justice, criminology and legal studies and conducted research in environmental analysis. He was a member of the Kappa Sigma fraternity (Mu Delta) and was appointed Commissioner of Campus Safety by the Associated Students of UC Irvine (ASUCI). He later attended Loyola Law School, Los Angeles where he graduated with honors and was the Chief Articles Editor of the Loyola Law Review.

Admitted to the California State Bar in 1993, he subsequently worked as a Judicial Law Clerk for the Honorable Ronald S.W. Lew, United States District Judge, Central District of California, in Los Angeles  and then as an associate for the law firm of Irell and Manella LLP, in Century City.

Career 
Alikhan's career in law enforcement, public safety, and homeland security also included service as a Technical Reserve Police Officer in Newport Beach, California, prosecuting juveniles while working in the Los Angeles District Attorney's Office, and prosecuting misdemeanor crimes with the Anaheim City Attorney's Office. He then served 10 years with the U.S. Department of Justice as a federal prosecutor in Los Angeles from 1997 to 2005 and then as a senior official at the Department of Justice in Washington, D.C. from 2005 through 2006.

Alikhan was recognized by the United States Department of Justice for his superior performance while serving as the first Chief of the Cyber and Intellectual Property Crimes Section at the U.S. Attorney's Office in Los Angeles. Based on his work in Los Angeles, he was recruited to work in Washington D.C. to as a Senior Adviser to both Attorney General John Ashcroft and Attorney General Alberto Gonzales to handle cybercrime and intellectual property initiatives. Alikhan has received awards from numerous federal law enforcement agencies including the FBI, U.S. Secret Service, Defense Criminal Investigative Service, Immigration and Customs Enforcement, Bureau of Alcohol Tobacco and Firearms, and NASA Office of Inspector General.

Appointment 
Arif Alikhan was appointed Deputy Mayor of Homeland Security in Los Angeles in September 2006 by Los Angeles Mayor Antonio Villaraigosa to replace Maurice Suh, a partner at the law firm of Gibson Dunn in Los Angeles. Upon his appointment as Deputy Mayor, then Attorney General Alberto Gonzales praised Alikhan's service in a public statement indicating:
Arif Alikhan's appointment as Deputy Mayor for Homeland Security and Public Safety is outstanding news for the city of Los Angeles, though we will certainly miss having him as part of the Department of Justice team. Arif has served with distinction as both an Assistant U.S. Attorney and as Vice Chairman of the Intellectual Property Task Force. His leadership within the Department has dramatically increased the profile of intellectual property and cyber crime issues, and he has been highly effective in overseeing the national Computer Hacking and Intellectual Property (CHIP) Program.

Arif leaves behind a legacy of hard work, innovative thinking, and dedication to the rule of law.
These are characteristics that he will bring to his new position, and the city of Los Angeles will be
fortunate to have him.

As Deputy Mayor, Alikhan was responsible for overseeing the Los Angeles Police Department, Los Angeles Fire Department, Emergency Management Department, their combined budgets of over $2 billion, and managing over $400 million in federal and state grants.

Alikhan received high marks for his accomplishments as Deputy Mayor of the City of Los Angeles from many including Mayor Villaraigosa. In June 2009, the Mayor stated that:

Arif Alikhan has been instrumental in advancing my administration's central priorities of preparing Los Angeles to respond to natural disasters and against the threat of terrorism, increasing public safety, and putting 1,000 new LAPD officers on our streets,” said Mayor Villaraigosa. “I wish him luck as he assumes this new role with the Obama Administration, and look forward to his continued efforts to help protect Los Angeles and our nation's cities.

Alikhan's efforts to hire 1,000 new LAPD officers resulted in the highest deployment level in LAPD history before Alikhan left for Washington. Additionally, Mr. Alikhan significantly advanced the Mayor's emergency preparedness and counter-terrorism initiatives, substantially increased cooperation with federal, state and local law enforcement agencies, led the effort to create the L.A. Fire Department's Professional Standards Division, and helped secure over $400 million in homeland security and public safety grants for the Los Angeles region. He was also a key coordinator and government official at major emergencies including numerous wild fires and the 2008 Chatsworth train collision that killed 25 people and injured over 300 train passengers.

Alikhan was appointed to DHS in June 2009 and is responsible for developing and coordinating department-wide policy issues involving the vast array of missions assigned to DHS. His team of scientists, analysts, attorneys, and economists work on issues ranging from counter-terrorism and information sharing to emergency management and cyber security.

Alikhan has served on several boards including the University of Southern California's CREATE Center for Homeland Security Government Advisory Committee. He was also an adjunct professor of law at USC's Gould School of Law where he taught criminal procedure. In 1997, he was named one of the top 40 California attorneys under the age of 40 by the Los Angeles Daily Journal and California Law Business.

References 

1968 births
Living people
American people of Pakistani descent
American businesspeople
United States Department of Homeland Security officials
American politicians of Indian descent